Marçelino Preka (born 2 August 2003) is an Albanian professional footballer who plays as a defender for Bylis.

References

2003 births
Living people
Footballers from Shkodër
Albanian footballers
Association football defenders
Albania youth international footballers
KF Bylis Ballsh players
Kategoria Superiore players
Kategoria e Parë players